Monocerellus is a monotypic genus of Asian dwarf spiders containing the single species, Monocerellus montanus. It was first described by A. V. Tanasevitch in 1983, and has only been found in Russia.

See also
 List of Linyphiidae species (I–P)

References

Linyphiidae
Monotypic Araneomorphae genera
Spiders of Russia